Jin Wang may refer to:

Wang Jin (disambiguation) — people with the surname Wang
Jin Wang, a character in the novel American Born Chinese

Chinese royalty
In Chinese history, Jin Wang (King/Prince of Jin or King/Prince Jin) may refer to:

Cao Wei and Jin dynasties
Sima Zhao (211–265), Cao Wei regent, known as Prince of Jin from 264 to 265
Emperor Wu of Jin (236–290), first emperor of Western Jin dynasty, known as Prince of Jin from 265 to 266 before he became emperor
Emperor Yuan of Jin (276–323), first emperor of Eastern Jin dynasty, known as Prince of Jin from 317 to 318 before he became emperor
Sima Bao (294–320), Jin dynasty prince and pretender, known as Prince of Jin after 319

5th to 12th centuries
Tuoba Fuluo (died 447), second son of Emperor Taiwu of Northern Wei
Emperor Yang of Sui (569–618), held the title Prince of Jin before becoming Emperor
Emperor Gaozong of Tang (628–683), third emperor of the Tang dynasty
Li Keyong (856–908), military governor during the late Tang dynasty
Chai Rong (died 959), second emperor of the Later Zhou dynasty
Emperor Taizong of Song (939–997), held the title Prince of Jin before becoming Emperor
Yelü Aoluwo (died 1122), oldest son of Emperor Tianzuo of Liao

Yuan and Ming dynasties
Gammala, (died 1302), son of Zhenjin, recreated as Prince of Jin in 1292
Yesün Temür Khan, Emperor Taiding of Yuan, (1293–1328), the title before becoming Emperor
Badamregjibuu, (?-1328) son of Yesün Temür Khan, Emperor Taiding of Yuan, recreated as Prince of Jin in 1324
Zhu Gang, (died 1398), Ming dynasty prince, third son of Hongwu Emperor

See also
Jin (disambiguation)